The 2015–16 network television schedules for the five major English commercial broadcast networks in Canada covers primetime hours from September 2015 through May 2016. The schedule is followed by a list per network of returning series, new series, and series canceled after the 2014–2015 television season, for Canadian, American and other series.

CBC Television was the first to announce its fall schedule on May 28, 2015, followed by Global on June 1, 2015 and Citytv on June 2, 2015; this was followed by CTV and CTV Two on June 4. As in the past, the commercial networks' announcements come shortly after the networks have had a chance to buy Canadian rights to new American series.

Legend 
 Light blue indicates Local Programming.
 Grey indicates Encore Programming.
 Light green indicates sporting events.
 Orange indicates movies.
 Red indicates Canadian content shows, which is programming that originated in Canada.
 Magenta indicates series being burned off and other irregularly scheduled programs, including specials.
 Cyan indicates Various Programming.
 Yellow indicates the current schedule.

Schedule 
 New series are highlighted in bold. Series that have changed network are not highlighted as new series.
 All times given are in Canadian Eastern Time and Pacific Time (except for some live events or specials). 
Most CBC programming airs at the same local time in all time zones, except Newfoundland time (add 30 minutes).
For commercial stations in the Central Time Zone, subtract one hour.
For commercial stations in the Atlantic and Mountain time zones, add one hour for programming between 8:00 and 10:00 PM. Programs airing at 10:00 PM ET/PT will generally air at 8:00 PM local on stations in these areas. For viewers in the Newfoundland time zone, add an additional 30 minutes to the Atlantic time schedule. 
Notwithstanding the above, timeslots may occasionally vary further in some areas due to local simultaneous substitution considerations, compliance with watershed restrictions, or other factors.

Sunday

Monday

Tuesday

Wednesday

Thursday

Friday

Saturday

By network

CBC Television 

Returning series:
 Canada's Smartest Person
 Dragons' Den
 The Fifth Estate
 Heartland
 Hello Goodbye
 Hockey Night in Canada
 Jekyll and Hyde
 Just for Laughs
 Marketplace
 Murdoch Mysteries
 Mr. D
 The National
 The Nature Of Things
 Rick Mercer Report
 Schitt's Creek
 Still Standing
 This Hour Has 22 Minutes
 X Company

New series:
 Crash Gallery
 Exhibitionists
 First Hand
 Interrupt This Program
 Keeping Canada Alive
 The Romeo Section
 This Life
 Young Drunk Punk (second run)

Not returning from 2014 to 2015:
Strange Empire

Returning series:
 Coronation Street

New series:
 Please Like Me
 Raised by Wolves

Not returning from 2014 to 2015:

Citytv 

Returning series:
Sunnyside
Young Drunk Punk

New series:
Mr. D (second run)

Not returning from 2014 to 2015:

Returning series:
2 Broke Girls
The Bachelor
Black-ish
Brooklyn Nine-Nine
Empire
Hell's Kitchen
The Middle
Mike & Molly (also on CTV)
The Mindy Project
Modern Family
Mom
New Girl
Scorpion
World's Funniest Fails

New series:
Bob's Burgers (moved from Global)
Bordertown
Cooper Barrett's Guide to Surviving Life
Family Guy (moved from Global)
Grandfathered
The Grinder
The Last Man on Earth
Life in Pieces
Little Big Shots
The Muppets
Rush Hour
Scream Queens
Thursday Night Football
Undateable

Not returning from 2014 to 2015:
Scandal

CTV/CTV Two 

Returning series:
etalk
MasterChef Canada
Motive
Saving Hope
W5

New series:

Not returning from 2014 to 2015:

Returning series:
Agents of S.H.I.E.L.D.
The Amazing Race
Arrow
The Big Bang Theory
Blue Bloods
Castle
Criminal Minds
CSI: Cyber
Dancing with the Stars
The Flash
The Goldbergs
Gotham
Grey's Anatomy
Grimm
Hot in Cleveland
How to Get Away with Murder
Law & Order: Special Victims Unit
MasterChef Junior
Mike & Molly (also on Citytv)
The Mysteries of Laura
NFL GameDay
NFL on Fox
Once Upon a Time
Reign
Shark Tank
The Vampire Diaries
The Voice

New series:
Best Time Ever with Neil Patrick Harris
Blindspot
Blood & Oil
The Catch
Code Black
Legends of Tomorrow
Lucifer
Sleepy Hollow (moved from Global)
Quantico

Not returning from 2014 to 2015:

Global 

Returning series:
Big Brother Canada
Entertainment Tonight
Entertainment Tonight Canada

New series:
The Code
Houdini and Doyle

Not returning from 2014 to 2015:
Rookie Blue

Returning series:
The Blacklist
Bones
Chicago Fire
Chicago P.D.
Elementary
The Good Wife
Hawaii Five-0
Madam Secretary
NCIS
NCIS: Los Angeles
NCIS: New Orleans
Survivor
The Simpsons

New series:
Angel from Hell
Chicago Med
Containment
Heartbeat
Heroes Reborn
Limitless
Minority Report
Shades of Blue
Supergirl
Telenovela
Truth Be Told

Not returning from 2014 to 2015:
Bob's Burgers (moved to Citytv)
Family Guy (moved to Citytv)
Sleepy Hollow (moved to CTV)

References 

 
 
Canadian television schedules